Tesfaye Tafa (born 15 November 1962) is a retired Ethiopian runner.

International competitions

References

1962 births
Living people
Ethiopian male long-distance runners
Ethiopian male marathon runners
Ethiopian male cross country runners
20th-century Ethiopian people
21st-century Ethiopian people